Nebria catenulata is a species of metallic green coloured ground beetle from Nebriinae subfamily that can be found in North Korea and Russia.

Distribution

References

catenulata
Beetles described in 1820
Beetles of Asia